The A.E.K.–Olympiacos rivalry is a football local derby played between AEK Athens F.C. and Olympiacos. Both located in the Attica urban area. A.E.K. comes from Nea Filadelfeia, a suburb of Athens, while Olympiacos from the port of Athens, Piraeus. The matches between the two teams are renowned for their strong on-pitch rivalry, they usually have high attendances, and most of them are very entertaining and very competitive with many goals scored by both sides.

History

Of the many players transferred between the two clubs no one has ever scored in the matches between them for both teams but Rafik Djebbour, Daniel Batista and Karim Ansarifard. The top scorers in the derby are Mimis Papaioannou for AEK with 14 goals and  Predrag Đorđević for Olympiacos with 10 goals.

Statistics

Head-to-head

Records
Record Alpha Ethniki win
Olympiacos
Home: Olympiacos – AEK 6–0, Karaiskakis Stadium, 8 February 1981(Galakos 30', 53', 84', Kousoulakis 68', Orfanos 75', Vamvakoulas 80')and Olympiacos – AEK 6–0, Karaiskakis Stadium, 20 March 2011(Djebbour 2', 61', Mellberg 7', Fuster 20', Mirallas 68', Holebas 71')
Away: AEK – Olympiacos 1–5, Nikos Goumas Stadium, 26 November 1972(Nikolaidis 57' pen. – Triantafyllos 35', Argyroudis 48', Delikaris 50', Gioutsos 55', Sinetopoulos 60')and AEK – Olympiacos 1–5, Athens Olympic Stadium, 4 April 2021(Ansarifard 88' – Camara 17', Masouras 23', 44', El-Arabi 35', Fortounis 74')
AEK
Home: AEK – Olympiacos 4–0, Athens Olympic Stadium, 30 March 2008 (Blanco 10', Edinho 12', Liberopoulos 32', Kafes 60')
Away: Olympiacos – AEK 1–4, Karaiskakis Stadium, 3 December 1967(Gioutsos 19' – Karafeskos 8', Papaioannou 55', 70', Pomonis 83')
Record Cup win
Olympiacos
Home: Olympiacos – AEK 6–1, Athens Olympic Stadium, 24 January 2001(Georgatos 5', Giovanni 22', 32', Ofori-Quaye 52', Álvez 79', Giannakopoulos 84' – Maladenis 25')
Away: AEK – Olympiacos 1–3, Nikos Goumas Stadium, 10 February 1988(Mavrodimos 38' – Hantzidis 11', Mitropoulos 59', Funes 76')
AEK
Home: AEK – Olympiacos 6–1, Nikos Goumas Stadium, 17 May 1978(Bajević 15', Mavros 19', 76', 89', Konstantinou 38', Nikoloudis 57' – Spence 13')
Away: Olympiacos – AEK 1–3, Athens Olympic Stadium, 3 January 1996(Ivić 64' pen. – Batista 20', 47', Kostis 27')
Attendance records (in Athens Olympic Stadium)
74,465 AEK – Olympiacos 0–0, 9 February 1986
74,419 Olympiacos – AEK 2–2, 29 September 1985
72,153 Olympiacos – AEK 0–1, 30 December 1984
72,047 Olympiacos – AEK 2–2, 13 September 1987

Matches list

Super League Greece (1959–60 - present)

1 The original match was played on 13–01–1991 at Nikos Goumas Stadium. It was interrupted in the 84th minute due to tear gas use, while Olympiacos were leading by 1–2. A replay was decided.
2 The original match was played on 24–10–1993. It was interrupted in the 85th minute due to a power cut at Nikos Goumas Stadium, while the score was 1–1. A replay was decided.

1st place play-off match (tie)

1 Olympiacos didn't show up in the match, so AEK was declared winner and was awarded the Championship by the Greek F.A.

Greek Cup

1 Match suspended at 40th minute (score: 1–2). AEK were awarded a 0–2 win.
2 Olympiacos didn't show up in the final, so AEK was declared winner and was awarded the cup by the Greek F.A.

3 Match suspended at 69th minute (score: 1–1). Olympiacos were awarded a 0–2 win.

4 Match suspended at 90th minute (score: 0–1). Olympiacos were awarded a 0–3 win.

Greek League Cup Final

Greek Super Cup

Head-to-head ranking in Alpha Ethniki / Super League Greece

• Total: Olympiacos 41 time higher, AEK 20 times higher.

Men in both teams

1 Takis Nikoloudis returned to AEK in 1982 after joining Olympiacos for 3 years.

2 Daniel Batista returned to AEK in 1995 after joining Olympiacos for 3 years.

3 Grigoris Georgatos returned to Olympiacos in 2003 after joining AEK for 1 year.

4 Rafik Djebbour returned to AEK in 2015 after joining Olympiacos for 2 years.

References

External links
 in Greek
 in Greek

AEK Athens F.C.
Greece football derbies
Olympiacos F.C.